Vingtaine du Douet is one of the five vingtaines of St Peter Parish on the Channel Island of Jersey.

Douet
Douet